Booking (부킹) is a monthly manhwa anthology published by the South Korean Haksanpub.

Currently running manhwa titles

Aflame Inferno
Witchcraft Troops
Street Jam
Yongbi Bulpae Oejeon
The Phantom King
Beast 9

Currently running manga titles

Fullmetal Alchemist
InuYasha
Vagabond
Hatsukoi Limited

Published manhwa

Aflame Inferno
ChunChu (on hiatus)
Banya: The Explosive Delivery Man
Shaman Warrior (Dangu)
Ghost
Aspirin
Smacker
XS
High School
Veritas
Jack Frost

Published manga

Hunter × Hunter
Kamen Teacher

External links 
 Official Webpage (Korean)

Manhwa magazines
Anime and manga magazines
Magazines established in 1998
Magazines published in South Korea
Monthly magazines